Lafayette is a city in Yamhill County, Oregon, United States on the Yamhill River and Oregon Route 99W. It was founded in 1846 and incorporated in 1878. The population was 4,423 at the 2020 census.

History

Lafayette was founded in 1846 by pioneer/entrepreneur Joel Perkins, who previously had lived in Lafayette, Indiana and named it similarly for an important  figure of the American Revolution, Le Marquis de Lafayette (General Lafayette).

The post office was established in 1851, and the city was incorporated by the Oregon Legislative Assembly on October 17, 1878.

Lafayette was the county seat of Yamhill County from its founding until 1889, when county residents voted to move the county seat to McMinnville.

Geography

It is located on State Highway 99W between McMinnville and Dundee.

Lock and dam

In 1900 a Yamhill River lock and dam was completed about  downriver from Lafayette, Oregon. The lock was decommissioned in 1954. The dam was deliberately destroyed in 1963 to allow better passage for salmon on the river. The site of the lock and dam is now a county park.

Demographics

2010 census
As of the census of 2010, there were 3,742 people, 1,209 households, and 938 families living in the city. The racial makeup of the city was 84.6% White, 0.3% African American, 0.9% Native American, 0.7% Asian, 9.8% from other races, and 3.6% from two or more races. Hispanic or Latino of any race were 22.0% of the population.

There were 1,209 households, of which 47.5% had children under the age of 18 living with them, 60.2% were married couples living together, 11.0% had a female householder with no husband present, 6.4% had a male householder with no wife present, and 22.4% were non-families. 15.6% of all households were made up of individuals, and 4.5% had someone living alone who was 65 years of age or older. The average household size was 3.10 and the average family size was 3.45.

The median age in the city was 33.2 years. 32.1% of residents were under the age of 18; 6.2% were between the ages of 18 and 24; 30.9% were from 25 to 44; 22.6% were from 45 to 64; and 8% were 65 years of age or older. The gender makeup of the city was 51.3% male and 48.7% female.

2000 census

In the census of 2000, there were 2,586 people, 841 households, and 656 families living in the city. The population density was 2,869.9 people per square mile (1,109.4/km2). There were 888 housing units at an average density of 985.5 per square mile (381.0/km2). The racial makeup of the city was 85.89% White, 0.43% African American, 1.62% Native American, 0.62% Asian, 0.23% Pacific Islander, 8.35% from other races, and 2.86% from two or more races. Hispanic or Latino of any race were 20.22% of the population.

There were 841 households, out of which 44.0% had children under the age of 18 living with them, 62.3% were married couples living together, 11.3% had a female householder with no husband present, and 21.9% were non-families. 16.6% of all households were made up of individuals, and 4.8% had someone living alone who was 65 years of age or older. The average household size was 3.07 and the average family size was 3.43.

In the city, the population was spread out, with 32.7% under the age of 18, 8.8% from 18 to 24, 33.4% from 25 to 44, 17.3% from 45 to 64, and 7.8% who were 65 years of age or older. The median age was 31 years. For every 100 females, there were 101.7 males. For every 100 females age 18 and over, there were 101.2 males.

The median income for a household in the city was $38,611, and the median income for a family was $41,283. Males had a median income of $31,351 versus $22,466 for females. The per capita income for the city was $14,542. About 10.7% of families and 13.0% of the population were below the poverty line, including 17.1% of those under age 18 and 6.8% of those age 65 or over.

Notable people
 Pauline Alderman, musicologist and composer
 Bert E. Haney, judge on the U.S. Court of Appeals for the Ninth Circuit
 Anson G. Henry, Lafayette physician, deputy surveyor of Yamhill County, surveyor general of Washington Territory, and lifelong friend and physician of Abraham Lincoln
 George W. McBride, member of Oregon Legislative Assembly and Speaker of the House, Oregon Secretary of State, and U.S. Senator from Oregon

References

External links

 Entry for Lafayette in the Oregon Blue Book
 Lafayette Locks Historical Park

Cities in Oregon
Cities in Yamhill County, Oregon
Populated places established in 1846
Portland metropolitan area
1846 establishments in Oregon Country
Former county seats in Oregon